Umbrella Entertainment is an Australian film distribution company that began operating in 2001. It is based in Kew, Victoria.

Umbrella Entertainment manages the theatrical, physical, and digital releases of Australian films, documentaries and arthouse indie films. Umbrella Entertainment has amassed a catalogue of over 1,500 titles, including a large collection of remastered classic Australian films and TV programs on physical media.

Umbrella Entertainment's commercial library consists mostly of Australian and Ozploitation films. The company has a history of regularly restoring genre classics such as Razorback, Frog Dreaming, The Man From Hong Kong, and Mad Dog Morgan. In addition to Australian films, Umbrella Entertainment exhibits rare and classic cult films in Australia and New Zealand. Notable examples include the restoration of the 1990 remake of Night of the Living Dead and Night of the Creeps. All restorations are scanned in either 4K and 2K from original film materials.

History

Umbrella Entertainment was founded by Jeff Harrison, following a career in music distribution. The company distributes film and television to both Australia and New Zealand, and undertakes rights management activities for theatrical and non-theatrical distribution, television licensing, video-on-demand, hotels and air-lines. Umbrella specialises in the restoration and distribution of Australian classic cinema, as Harrison states, "My original idea was simply that a fair amount of Australian product that I knew had either not be brought out on DVD or brought out poorly". In addition to distributing the original product, Umbrella seeks out and interviews original performers, film makers, cast, crew and other relevant extras for each release.

In 2015, Umbrella began distributing films digitally to online streaming services. Australian hits, such as The Big Steal and Malcolm are available on Amazon Prime Video.

In 2015, Jeff Harrison was appointed Treasurer of Australian Independent Distributors Association (AIDA).

Theatrical
As a premium 'all rights' licensor, Umbrella Entertainment have handled the theatrical distribution for a number of titles in Australia and New Zealand. With a long history of restoring Australian classic film, many of these titles have been screened in Australian cinemas and film festivals. In 2012, Umbrella distributed Emilio Estevez's The Way starring Martin Sheen. The film opened on 35 screens, and expanded to 110 screens during its theatrical season.

Since 2014, Umbrella Entertainment has collaborated with Australian production company, Causeway Films, to release The Babadook, Cargo, and Buoyancy. Despite industry-wide issues with cinema closures due to COVID-19 restrictions in Australia, Umbrella Entertainment continued to release titles in cinemas, having showcased 18 titles in 2020 and 14 title in 2019.

To celebrate the 85th birthday of Sydney's Ritz Cinema in 2022, a year-long program of "Australia on Celluloid" was announced to showcase classic Australian films on 35mm print. The program was presented in partnership with Umbrella Entertainment and the National Film and Sound Archive (NFSA).

Restoration of Australian films
Umbrella Entertainment has a long history of restoring and distributing rare, classic, and cult titles. As of 2013, Umbrella Entertainment had restored over 100 Australian film in high definition, often in collaboration with the National Film & Sound Archive. As well as being sourced from NFSA archives, Umbrella Entertainment produces their own extra featurettes and interviews with cast and crew, gaining access to previous untouched archival materials including footage, outtakes, interviews and production documents.

Regarding classic Australian films, founder Jeff Harrison has stated, "Listen, you’ve got an old film there, but it shouldn’t be sitting in the garage. Why don’t we get it out and try to get people to watch it again?’ We’ve restored many Fred Schepisi films, many Bruce Beresford films”. On the capacity at which Umbrella has restored Australian cinema, producer Antony I. Ginnane once claimed "“Apart from the government- funded NFSA, Umbrella has done more than any other entity to restore and re-spotlight Australian cinema from the 1950s through to the 1990s". Likewise, Australian director Brian Trenchard-Smith states, "Umbrella and Madman's commitment to release past Australian films on DVD is a significant step in preserving our movie heritage... Contemporary audiences can now be introduced to a broad spectrum of Oz Cinema from classics and crowd pleasers to noble failures and underrated obscurities".

In 2017, the South Australian Film Corporation partnered with Umbrella Entertainment to restore 25 SAFC-produced titles.

List of restored and remastered Australian films
Since it was founded, Umbrella Entertainment has led the restoration of a number of Australian classic films, often in collaboration with the National Film and Sound Archive and ROAR Digital.

Some of the titles Umbrella Entertainment has restored and remastered are:
 The Chant of Jimmie Blacksmith
 Road Games
 Long Weekend
 The Man From Hong Kong
 Dark Age
 Cosi
 Body Melt
 Malcolm
 Angel Baby
 Sunday Too Far Away
 Breaker Morant
 The Club
 Storm Boy
 Money Movers
 The Shiralee 
 Picnic at Hanging Rock
 Puberty Blues
 Shame
 The F.J. Holden
 The Adventures of Barry McKenzie
 Far East
 Buddies
 Dimboola
 Celia
 Mouth to Mouth
 Spirits of the Air, Gremlins of the Clouds
 Shine
 Burke & Wills
 Jedda
 Goodbye Paradise

References

Companies based in Melbourne
Film distribution
Australian companies established in 2001